USBE may refer to:
 Umeå School of Business
 Utah State Board of Education